The Washington Huskies baseball team is the varsity intercollegiate baseball team of the University of Washington, located in Seattle, Washington, United States. The program has been a member of the NCAA Division I Pac-12 Conference since the start of the 1960 season, preceded by the Pacific Coast Conference.

The team has played at Husky Ballpark since 1998; the on-campus venue was renovated extensively for the start of the 2014 season. Jason Kelly has been the program's head coach since the start of the 2023 season. The program has appeared in nine NCAA Tournaments. It has won two Pac-10 North-South Division Playoffs, six Pac-10 North Division Titles, eight PCC North Division Titles, and two PCC Regular Season Championships. As of the start of the 2014 season, 18 former Huskies have appeared in the major leagues.

History
The baseball program at UW began play in the 1901 season, in which it went 4–6 under head coach Fred Schlock.  After not competing in 1902, the team returned in the 1903 season.  From its inception through the end of the 1915 season, the team did not belong to a conference.  Prior to 1923, most of the program's head coaches served only one or two seasons, with Dode Brinker being the only exception.  Brinker served four tenures as the program's head coach (1906, 1909–1910, 1915–1916, 1918–1919), in between which he also played professional baseball.  In his seven seasons as the team's head coach, Washington had a 59–28 record.

Pacific Coast Conference
Under Brinker, the program joined the Pacific Coast Conference (PCC) for the 1916 season.  After not playing in 1917 due to World War II and competing as an independent in 1918, the PCC resumed baseball in 1919.  Washington won that year's  conference championship with a perfect 10–0 record in Brinker's final season.  It won the PCC Championship again in 1922 under head coach Robert L. Mathews.

In 1922, the university adopted the husky as its mascot and athletic nickname.  Since 1920, the teams' nickname had been the Sundodgers, and prior to that the university's athletic programs were known as both the Indians and the Vikings.

Prior to the 1923 season, Tubby Graves became the program's head coach; the Huskies won seven PCC North Division titles, all in Graves' first ten seasons.   In 1932, the Huskies won the North Division title with a 13–4 conference record, the division title was the team's last under Graves, who coached through the end of the 1946 season. In the 1930s, the team's home venue was named Graves Field in honor of Graves, and the name carried over to the next venue used by Washington from the late-1960s until the end of the 1997 season.

After finishing no higher than second in the PCC North Division from 1932 to 1951, the team tied for the division title in 1951.  In the 1959 season, the Huskies won the North Division title outright under coach Dale Parker.  In doing so, the program qualified for its first NCAA Tournament.  It finished second in the District VIII Regionals with a 1–2 record.

Pac-12 Conference
On July 1, 1959, the PCC dissolved following a scandal involving illegal payments to football players at several of the conference's schools.  In reaction, five former PCC members, including Washington, formed the Athletic Association of Western Universities (AAWU), which began play in the 1959–1960 school year.  With the addition of several other schools, the conference eventually became known as the Pac-12 Conference.

Washington struggled in its first two decades after beginning play in the AAWU in the 1960 season.  It did not have a winning conference record in its first 19 seasons in the AAWU (renamed the Pacific-8 Conference following the 1968 season).  The stretch included five consecutive last-place finishes from 1967 to 1971 under head coach Ken Lehman.  The program had its first winning conference record in the 1979 season, when it finished in second place in the North Division of the Pacific-10 Conference, which had been renamed prior to that season.

In 1981, head coach Bob MacDonald, who had held the position since prior to the 1977 season, led the team to its first division title since 1959.  MacDonald was also the head coach in 1985, when the team qualified for its first Pac-10 North Division Tournament.  The Huskies qualified for the tournament in each of the next five seasons, finishing as the tournament runner-up in 1987 and 1990.  In 1992, MacDonald's final season, the Huskies qualified for their second NCAA Tournament with a 39–21 record and North Division title.  The team was seeded sixth in the six-team West Regional.  After defeating first-seeded Arizona and fourth-seeded Fresno State in its opening two games, the team lost consecutive games to Pepperdine and Hawaii and was eliminated.

Following the 1992 season, MacDonald left Washington to become the head coach at Navy and was succeeded by Husky  assistant coach Ken Knutson.  In 1993, Knutson's first season, the team won the Pac-10 North and had a 39-19 overall record but did not receive an at-large bid to the NCAA Tournament.  In 1994, the team did qualify for the NCAA Tournament and played in the Midwest II Regional.  The Huskies lost to Georgia Tech in the regional finals.  The program continued to have success in the 1990s, winning the Pac-10 North Division title in 1996, 1997, and 1998.  It qualified for the 1997 and 1998 NCAA Tournaments after winning the Pac-10 North-South Division Playoff in each season.  Individually, Chris Magruder, who later played Major League Baseball, was named a Second Team All-American by the National Collegiate Baseball Writers Association in 1998.

Prior to the 1998 season, the program opened Husky Ballpark, a newly built on-campus home venue that replaced Graves Field.  In Washington's first game at the new facility, the Huskies lost to Gonzaga 4–3.

In the three seasons from 1999 to 2001, the program finished with a conference winning percentage of .500 or worse and did not qualify for the NCAA Tournament.  From 2002 to 2004, however, the team qualified for three consecutive NCAA Tournaments.  Its most successful tournament came in 2004, when the Huskies qualified as the second-seeded team in the Oxford Regional.  After losing its opening game to Tulane, the team defeated Ole Miss and Western Kentucky in consecutive elimination games before being eliminated by Tulane in the Regional Finals.  Future Major League Baseball players on the 2004 team included Tim Lincecum and Brent Lillibridge.  Lincecum was named that season's co-National Freshman of the Year by Collegiate Baseball.

Following the 2009 season, head coach Knutson was fired after four consecutive losing seasons in the Pac-10. He was replaced by Indiana State head coach Lindsay Meggs, who played college ball at UCLA. In Meggs' first four seasons, the Huskies' highest win total was 30 (in 2012), and their highest Pac-12 finish was a tie for 6th (in 2013).  In 2014, the program reached its first NCAA Tournament in a decade, going 41–17 and finishing second in the Pac-12.  At the Oxford Regional, Washington went 2–2, defeating three-seed Georgia Tech twice and losing to host Ole Miss twice, both games by one run. The Huskies' 2014 success coincided with extensive, $15 million renovations to Husky Ballpark.

Conference affiliations
 Independent (1901–1915)
 Pacific Coast Conference (1916–1959), independent in war years of 1918 and 1944
 Pac-12 Conference (1960–present)
 Athletic Association of Western Universities, 1960–1966
 Pacific-8 Conference, 1967–1978
 Pacific-10 Conference, 1979–2011

Venues

Old Graves Field
Although a 1931 source refers to the team's home venue simply as the "Husky ball lot," sources as early as 1936 refer to the program's home venue as Graves Field, named for Tubby Graves, the program's head coach from 1923 to 1946.  The field was located directly north of Hec Ed Pavilion and east of the current Graves Hall. Oriented northeast, the infield was at the western end of the current outdoor tennis courts; its concrete grandstand continues as the Bill Quillian tennis stadium.  Left and center field were displaced by the Intramural Activities Building.  In addition to Washington baseball, the field hosted freshman football games and the Whitworth College (NAIA) baseball team for periods of its history.

Graves Field
With the construction of the Intramural Activities Building in the late 1960s, a new baseball field was built at the northeast corner of the UW campus. Also oriented northeast with natural grass, its center field fence was near the intersection of NE 45th Street and Union Bay Place (now Mary Gates Memorial Avenue). Originally a practice field to the new main field adjacent to the west, it became the program's venue shortly after its construction and was also named after Graves. In 1973, it underwent $19,000 renovations.  It had a seating capacity of 1,500 spectators in temporary seating.  Used by the program until the end of the 1997 season, it is now occupied by intramural athletic fields.

Husky Ballpark

During the 1990s, plans for a new stadium to replace Graves Field were announced.  Ground was broken in 1997 and the $4.75 million Husky Ballpark hosted its first regular season game in late February 1998. Oriented southeast, it is located north of Husky Stadium and northeast of the site of Old Graves Field.  It featured an AstroTurf infield, changed to FieldTurf in 2005, with a well-draining natural grass outfield. It had a seating capacity of 2,212 and employed only temporary bleachers for its first 16 seasons, through May 2013.

Renovation
Plans were announced in 2011 for a $15 million building project on a new Husky Ballpark.  The new stadium, over a decade overdue, was completed the start of the 2014 season; the new concrete grandstand will have a capacity of 2,500 spectators.  In addition to chairbacked seating behind home plate, it features berm seating past the left field fence.  The grass outfield has been removed and the entire field is  FieldTurf, with only the pitcher's mound as dirt.

Alternate venues

Sick's Stadium

While Graves Field was renovated during the 1973 season, the Huskies used Sick's Stadium as its home field.  The stadium opened in 1938 and was a major league venue for one season, the home field of the Seattle Pilots in 1969.
Without a baseball tenant after 1976, it was salvaged in the late 1970s and demolished in 1979.

Kingdome

The Huskies played early season tournaments and occasional home games in the Kingdome, which was demolished in March 2000.

Safeco Field

Since the 2007 season, the program has played a single conference game per season at Safeco Field, home of the Seattle Mariners.

Head coaches
The program's most successful head coach is Ken Knutson, who coached the team from 1993 to 2009 and had 584 wins.  Its longest tenured head coach is Tubby Graves, who coached for 24 seasons (1923–1946).

Source:

Yearly records
Below is a table of the program's yearly records.

Source:

Notable former players

The following is a list of notable former Huskies and the seasons in which they played for the program.

 Rick Anderson (1978)
 Tracy Baker (1910)
 Braden Bishop
 Mike Blowers (1986)
 Dode Brinker (1903–1905)
 Scott Brow (1988–1990)
 Nick Hagadone (2005–2007)
 Matt Hague (2005–2007)
 Bill Hutchinson (1929–1930)
 Chet Johnson (1937–1939)
 Rondin Johnson (1978–1980)
 Jake Lamb (2010–2012)
 Hal Lee (1932–1934)
 Brent Lillibridge (2003–2005)
 Tim Lincecum (2004–2006)
 Chris Magruder (1996–1998)
 Aaron Myette (1996)
 Tony Savage (1914)
 Hunky Shaw (1905)
 Max Soriano (1946–1949)
 Sean Spencer (1994–1995)
 Kevin Stocker (1989–1991)
 Sammy White (1947–1948)
 Sean White (2000–2003)

Retired numbers
The program has retired one jersey number.

See also
Washington Huskies baseball players

Major League Baseball Draft

2012 MLB Draft
Four Huskies were selected in the 2012 Major League Baseball Draft: 3B Jacob Lamb by the Arizona Diamondbacks (6th round), P Aaron West by the Houston Astros (17th round), OF Chase Anselment by the Atlanta Braves (17th round), and C B.K. Santy by the Minnesota Twins (30th round).  All four players signed professional contracts with their respective teams.

In the 2013 MLB Draft, three Huskies were selected
in the [[2013 MajorDraftP Austin Voth by the Washington Nationals (5th round), P Tyler Kane by the Miami Marlins (38th round), and SS Ty Afenir by the New York Yankees (39th round). All three signed with their respective teams.

References

External links
Official site

 
1901 establishments in Washington (state)
Baseball teams established in 1901